The 1894 Massachusetts gubernatorial election was held on November 6, 1894. Incumbent Republican Governor Frederic Greenhalge was re-elected to a second term in office, defeating Democratic former U.S. Representative John E. Russell.

General election

Results

See also
 1894 Massachusetts legislature

References

Governor
1894
Massachusetts
November 1894 events